Casey James is the self-titled debut studio album by American Idol season nine finalist,  Casey James. The album was released on March 20, 2012 in the United States by BNA Records. The album produced three singles: "Let's Don't Call It a Night," "Crying on a Suitcase," and "The Good Life."

Background
James signed with Sony Music Nashville in August 2010 after appearing on American Idol, and had planned to release his album in 2011. The album however was not released until March 2012.  James co-wrote nine of the CD's eleven tracks and co-produced the CD with Chris Lindsey. James co-wrote his single "Let's Don't Call It a Night" with Brice Long and Terry McBride.

Reception

The album is generally well received by the critics.  Stephen Thomas Erlewine of Allmusic considered that every element in the album "has been vetted and polished, every song targeted at an individual audience", and that "there is the soul of a musician evident beneath the heavy gloss, the sense that James is attempting to reshape his favorite sounds for a wide audience."   Matt Bjorke of Roughstock thought that it is a "well-written, strongly-produced debut album", while Billy Dukes of Taste of Country considered it "an easy album to listen to start to finish, and the singer’s beachy, gravely timber make him easy to identify."

Chart performance and sales
Casey James debuted at number 23 on the Billboard 200, with first week sales of 14,000 copies.  The album has sold 77,000 copies in the US as of April 2013.

Track listing

Personnel
Pat Buchanan- electric guitar
Gary Burnette- acoustic guitar
Perry Coleman- background vocals
Dan Dugmore- pedal steel guitar
Shannon Forrest- drums
Tony Harrell- accordion, organ, piano, Wurlitzer
Casey James- dobro, acoustic guitar, electric guitar, slide guitar, lead vocals
Chris Lindsey- keyboards
B. James Lowry- acoustic guitar
Jimmie Lee Sloas- bass guitar
Ilya Toshinsky- banjo, acoustic guitar

Singles
 "Let's Don't Call It a Night" as released on August 15, 2011, and sold 5,000 copies in its debut week.
"Crying on a Suitcase" is the second single.
"The Good Life" was released as the album's third single.

Charts

Weekly charts

Year-end charts

Singles

References 

2012 debut albums
Casey James albums
BNA Records albums
Albums produced by Chris Lindsey
19 Recordings albums